Samuel Trelawny (1630 – 1666) was an English lawyer and politician who sat in the House of Commons  at various times between 1659 and 1666.

Trelawny was the eldest surviving son of Robert Trelawny and was baptised on 31 March 1630. His father was a merchant of Ham and MP for Plymouth. Trelawny matriculated at Exeter College, Oxford in 1647 and entered Gray's Inn in 1647.

In 1659, Trelawny was elected Member of Parliament for Bossiney for the Third Protectorate Parliament. In 1660 he was elected MP in double returns for both Camelford and for Plymouth and sat for Plymouth  in the Convention Parliament. He became commissioner for assessment for Devon in August 1660. He was called to the bar in 1661 and became a commissioner for assessment for Cornwall. He also became J.P. for Devon and Cornwall. He was re-elected MP for Plymouth for the Cavalier Parliament in 1661 and sat until his death in 1666.

Trelawny died at Hengar and was buried at St Tudy on 26 April 1666.

Trelawny married  Elizabeth Billing, daughter of John Billing of Hengar on 5 February 1651. He was the brother of John Trelawny.

References

1630 births
1666 deaths
Alumni of Exeter College, Oxford
Members of the pre-1707 English Parliament for constituencies in Cornwall
Members of Gray's Inn
Place of birth unknown
17th-century English lawyers
Members of the Parliament of England for Plymouth
English MPs 1659
English MPs 1660
English MPs 1661–1679
Burials in Cornwall